Julian Kulski (5 December 1892 in Warsaw – 18 August 1976 in Warsaw) was a Polish civil servant, best known for being Mayor of Warsaw during World War II.

During the pre-war period he was a Vice President of Warsaw (1935-1939) under Stefan Starzyński, with whom he actively led a defense of the city during the Invasion of Poland. He was named by German occupation authorities the President after Starzyński was arrested. Kulski accepted this post on the advice of the resistance movement and the Polish Government in Exile and during his tenure actively worked with them against the occupation forces, always remaining loyal to Poland.

Before he became a part of the Warsaw municipal government, he served in the Polish Legions in World War I (1914-1917) and the Polish Army (1919-1921). He was also a commander of the People's Militia in Warsaw (1918-1919) and a longtime high-ranking employee of the Ministry of Treasury.

Because of his accomplishment during the war, Kulski remained widely recognized.

His son, also called Julian Kulski (3 March 1929 - ) was a member of the Polish underground during the war from ages 12 to 15. He published a book and a video about his experiences called Legacy of the White Eagle in 2006. He moved to the US and became a prominent architect.

References
 Short official biography

External links
 The younger Kulski's book and DVD
 - interview with his son Julian E. Kulski

1892 births
1976 deaths
Polish resistance members of World War II
Politicians from Warsaw
Mayors of Warsaw
Polish legionnaires (World War I)
Recipients of the Silver Cross of the Virtuti Militari
Recipients of the Order of Polonia Restituta
Burials at Powązki Cemetery